"Nobody's Child" is a song written by Cy Coben and Mel Foree and first recorded by Hank Snow in 1949. Many other versions of this song exist.

History 
It was first recorded by Hank Snow in 1949 and it became one of his standards, although it did not chart for him. The song has been covered several times in the UK. It was on Lonnie Donegan's first album in 1956 (which went to No. 2 on the UK Albums Chart), and in 1969 Karen Young took the song to No. 6 on the UK Singles Chart and used it as the title track on her album. In 1969, a recording by Hank Williams Jr. peaked at No. 46 on the US Country chart. The Traveling Wilburys' 1990 version made it to No. 44 on the UK chart.

The song lyrics are about an orphan whom no one wants to adopt because he is blind:

I'm nobody's child, I'm nobody's child  Just like a flower I'm growing wild  No mommy's kisses and no daddy's smile  Nobody wants me, I'm nobody's child.

The Beatles with Tony Sheridan 

It was also covered by Tony Sheridan when he was recording in Hamburg, Germany, in June 1961 with the Beatles as his backing group. On this song, only Paul McCartney and Pete Best accompany Sheridan on bass and drums. This recording was released by Polydor in 1964 when the British group's popularity was at its height. Sheridan sings "Mammy's" (not "Mommy's"). He returned to studio later that year to re-record the vocal to "Sweet Georgia Brown", another Beatles track from these early sessions, and to tape a solo acoustic version of "Nobody's Child". The latter recording was only issued in Germany.

Release details

Singles
 "Ain't She Sweet" / "Nobody's Child" – released in 1964 by Atco in the US
 "Sweet Georgia Brown" / "Nobody's Child" (acoustic version) – released in 1964 in Germany by Polydor

Albums
 The Beatles' First! – original German release, April 1964
 The Beatles' First – released on August 4, 1967, in the UK
 Very Together – released in October 1969 in Canada
 In the Beginning (Circa 1960) – released on May 4, 1970, in the US
 The Early Tapes of the Beatles – worldwide CD release in 1984, with two new Sheridan songs not featuring the Beatles

Personnel
 Tony Sheridan – lead vocals
 Paul McCartney – bass guitar
 Pete Best – drums
 Bert Kaempfert – producer
 Peter Klemt – engineer

Traveling Wilburys

Former Beatle George Harrison recorded "Nobody's Child" with his band the Traveling Wilburys at the start of the sessions for their 1990 album Traveling Wilburys Vol. 3. This was in response to an urgent request from his wife, Olivia Harrison, for assistance for the thousands of Romanian orphans abandoned in state-run orphanages following the fall of Communism in Eastern Europe. Harrison's bandmate Bob Dylan suggested the song for its relevant message. Unable to remember all the lyrics, Harrison phoned his friend Joe Brown, who gave him the first verse. He wrote a new second verse to address the plight of the children and babies in Romania, which ends with the lines "They've long since stopped their crying, as no one ever hears / And no one's there to notice them or take away their fears".

Lead vocals on the recording were shared between Dylan, Harrison, Tom Petty and Jeff Lynne. According to Harrison, the group completed the track within 48 hours of Olivia's phone call.

The Wilburys' "Nobody's Child" was released as a charity single on June 18, 1990, backed by Dave Stewart's "Lumiere". The 12-inch and CD formats also included a live version of "With a Little Help from My Friends" by Ringo Starr. Proceeds from the single went to the Romanian Angel Appeal Foundation, launched by Olivia with support from the other former Beatles' wives. Derek Hayes directed a music video for "Nobody's Child", using animation and news footage of the Romanian children. On July 23, the song was issued as the opening track of the charity album Nobody's Child: Romanian Angel Appeal, which Harrison compiled from further recordings donated by artists such as Eric Clapton, Elton John, Van Morrison, Paul Simon and Stevie Wonder.

Weekly charts

Year-end charts

Other cover versions 
Agnes Chan on her 1971 album Will The Circle Game Be UnBroken with the local Life Records.
Billy Fury covered the song in 1972. 
Irene Ryder on her 1971 album Irene Ryder with EMI Regal Records
Max Romeo and Techniques All Stars, both versions on a 1974 split 7-inch single released by Techniques Records.
Majda Sepe (Slovenija). Her version was titled "Sirota", translated by G. Strniša (1969).
The Alexander Brothers' biggest selling single was "Nobody's Child" in 1964.

References

External links
Ain't She Sweet / Nobody's Child at Discogs

1949 songs
RCA Records singles
Traveling Wilburys songs
The Beatles with Tony Sheridan songs
Hank Williams Jr. songs
Song recordings produced by Jeff Lynne
Songs written by Cy Coben
1949 singles
1964 singles
1990 singles